John Norman Bateman-Champain (14 March 1880 – 22 October 1950) was a first-class English cricketer, making five appearances for Gloucestershire, who later in life became the third Anglican Bishop suffragan of Knaresborough. Bateman-Champain was a right-handed batsman.

Early life and education
John Bateman-Champain was born at Richmond Hill, Surrey. Bateman-Champain was born into a military family, son of LtCol Sir John Underwood Bateman-Champain of the Bengal Royal Engineers. The younger John was educated at Cheltenham College and Caius College, Cambridge. and studied for ordination at Wells Theological College.

Sporting career
Bateman-Champain played 2 first-class matches for Gloucestershire in 1899, with his debut for the county coming against Lancashire and his second and final first-class match for the county coming against Nottinghamshire. Additionally, he also represented the Free Foresters in a 3 first-class matches, firstly in 1919 against Cambridge University and Oxford University and finally against Oxford University in 1920.

Ecclesiastical career
Upon graduating theological college, Bateman-Champain became assistant curate at St Mary's Church, Henbury before embarking overseas to become vicar of Germiston, South Africa. In 1912, he returned to St Mary's Church, Redcliffe as Vicar. During the Great War he was interviewed for a commission with the Army Chaplains' Department, and was described as an 'attractive personality A1'. He was sent to the Western Front and, from 1918, served at General Headquarters. 

In 1928, he became Rural Dean of Bedminster before a ten-year stint as Vicar of the Cathedral Church of St Nicholas, Newcastle upon Tyne, and Provost of the cathedral. His final appointment was as Bishop of Knaresborough, a suffragan bishop in the Diocese of Ripon. He was consecrated a bishop on St Matthias' day (24 February) 1938, by William Temple, Archbishop of York, at York Minster. On 15 July 1944, he was appointed as the second principal of the RAF Chaplains' School based at Magdalene College, Cambridge. Clergymen with a sporting background were favoured in the RAF Chaplains Branch, and the Master of Magdalene College would later comment that Bateman-Champain's presence in college "brought lustre and distinction to the scene". He continued as Bishop of Knaresborough until retirement to Bristol in 1948.

He had two sons and two daughters. One son was killed on active service in 1943.

Family and later life
Bateman-Champain was part of a large cricketing family. His brothers Claude, Francis and Hugh all played first-class cricket, as did his brother-in-law Frederick Currie. His uncles Fendall Currie, Revd Sir Frederick Currie, Robert Currie and William Currie also played first-class cricket.
During his time at Redcliffe (c. 1912–1914), he married Jean Monsell Maud. Bateman-Champain died at Westbury-on-Trym, Gloucestershire on 22 October 1950.

References

External links
John Bateman-Champain at Cricinfo
John Bateman-Champain at CricketArchive

1880 births
1950 deaths
Alumni of Gonville and Caius College, Cambridge
Bishops of Knaresborough
English cricketers
Free Foresters cricketers
Gloucestershire cricketers
People educated at Cheltenham College
People from Richmond, London
People from Surrey
Provosts and Deans of Newcastle
Sportspeople from Gloucestershire